Zhang Pingxiang (born March 1965) is a Chinese engineer currently serving as president of Northwest Institute of Non-ferrous Metal Research. He has been hailed as "the pioneer of superconducting materials and applications in China".

Biography
Zhang was born in Baoji, Shaanxi, in May 1963. He received his master's degree and doctor's degree from Shaanxi Normal University in 1985 and 1988, respectively. He earned his doctor's degree from Northeastern University (China) in 1996.

Honours and awards
 November 22, 2019 Member of the Chinese Academy of Engineering (CAE)

References

1963 births
Living people
People from Baoji
Engineers from Shaanxi
Shaanxi Normal University alumni
Northeastern University (China) alumni
Members of the Chinese Academy of Engineering